The Guadalcanal scaly-toed gecko (Lepidodactylus shebae) is a species of gecko. It is endemic to Guadalcanal in the Solomon Islands.

References

Lepidodactylus
Reptiles described in 1949
Endemic fauna of the Solomon Islands
Reptiles of the Solomon Islands
Taxa named by Vasco M. Tanner